Farahani (also written as Farahany) is a common family name in Iran. It may refer to:

Politicians 
 Ahmad Amirabadi Farahani, member of the Iranian parliament for Qom during 2012–2016 and 2016–2020
 Mirza Taghi Khan Farahani (Persian: میرزا تقی‌خان فراهانی) also known as Amir Kabir (Persian: امیرکبیر)  
 Ghaem Magham Farahani
 Mohsen Safaei Farahani

Musicians 
 Agha Ali Akbar Farahani, musician and tar-player
 Agha Mirza Abdollah Farahani, musician and setar-player
 Agha Mirza Hossein Gholi Farahani, musician and tar-player

Actors 
 Behzad Farahani
 Shaghayegh Farahani
 Golshifteh Farahani

Film makers 
 Ramin Farahani
 Mitra Farahani

Iranian-language surnames